Super Halcón Jr. (born April 30, 1987 in Mexico City, Mexico) is a Mexican luchador enmascarado, or masked professional wrestler currently working for the Mexican professional wrestling promotion Consejo Mundial de Lucha Libre (CMLL) portraying a tecnico ("Good guy") wrestling character. Super Halcón Jr.'s real name is not a matter of public record, as is often the case with masked wrestlers in Mexico where their private lives are kept a secret from the wrestling fans. His ring name is Spanish for "Super Falcon Junior", reflecting the fact that one of his father's ring name was "Super Halcón"

Personal life
Super Halcón Jr.'s full name is not publicly known, which is traditionally the case in Lucha Libre when a wrestler has never been unmasked, but it is known that his paternal last name is Melchor, revealed when his father José Luis Melchor Ortiz was unmasked. Super Halcón Jr. took his name from one of his father's most famous characters Super Halcón, but his father also worked under the ring names Bengala, Argos, Danny Ortiz, El Halcón and Halcón Ortiz.

Professional wrestling career
Super Halcón Jr. began his wrestling career around the end of 2008, when he began working on the Mexican independent circuit, including numerous matches for International Wrestling Revolution Group (IWRG) and Alianza Universal de Lucha Libre (AULL)

Consejo Mundial de Lucha Libre (2011–present)
CMLL introduced Generacion 2011 in early 2011 which a group of young wrestlers who all made their debut around the same time, they were not considered an actual group, more of a graduating class of the CMLL wrestling schools. Generacion 2011 included Super Halcón Jr., Magnus, Dragon Lee, Enrique Vera Jr., Hombre Bala Jr., Hijo del Signo and Boby Zavala. He made his in-ring debut on March 21, 2011 teaming with Centella de Oro and Metatron, defeating Disturbio, Hijo del Signo and Siki Osama Jr. CMLL held a tournament to find a new CMLL World Super Lightweight Champion in May 2011 which included Super Halcón Jr. He was eliminated in the opening round torneo cibernetico, which was won by Virus, who would later win the vacant championship CMLL had been promoting a feud between the Generacion 2011 rookies and a number of veteran low to mid-card rudos ("Bad guys") throughout most of 2011. By late 2011 that storyline began focusing more and more on the rivalry between the team of Super Halcón Jr. and Hombre Bala Jr. from Generacion 2011 and a brother team known as Los Rayos Tapatío ("The Lightning bolts from Guadalajara"; Rayo Tapatío I and Rayo Tapatío II). The two sides faced off several  matches where the two teams would focus more on each other than the other men in the matches. As the storyline escalated the four wrestlers involved would tear at each other's masks, at times winning by pulling the mask off the other one to gain an unfair advantage, escalating the conflict. After months of escalating the storyline CMLL finally announced that the two teams would face off in a Lucha de Apuesta ("Bet Match") where both teams would put their masks on the line and would be forced to unmask if they lost the match. The Luchas de Apuestas match took place on CMLL's first show of 2012 in Arena Mexico. The young team defeated the veterans, earning them their first major victory in CMLL. Following the match Los Rayos discussed leaving CMLL, humiliated by the loss of their masks. CMLL held a 16-man tournament focusing primarily on rookies called Torneo Sangre Nueva ("The New Blood Tournament") in March 2012 which saw Super Halcón Jr. among the participants. The second block competed on March 13, 2012, where Disturbio, Hombre Bala Jr., Raziel, and Tritón teamed up to face Robin, Bronco, Hijo del Signo and Super Halcon Jr. Raziel took the victory, eliminating Tritón to end the nearly 25 minute long match to move on to the finals. In March 2013 Super Halcón Jr. was one of 18 wrestlers who competed in the second annual Torneo Sangre Nueva. He competed in qualifying block B on March 5, 2013 for a place in the finals, the other wrestlers in Block B included Genesis, Robin, Sensei, Oro Jr., Disturbio, Guerrero Negro Jr., Inquisidor, Taurus and Zayco who competed in a torneo cibernetico, multi-man elimination match. He eliminated Zayco but was the seventh man eliminated over all when he was pinned by Guerrero Negro Jr. On January 1, 2014, Halcón Jr. defeated eleven other wrestlers to win the 2014 Copa Junior.

Championships and accomplishments
Comisión de Box y Lucha Libre Hidalgo
Hidalgo State Welterweight Championship (1 time, current)

Consejo Mundial de Lucha Libre
La Copa Junior (2014)

Luchas de Apuestas record

References

1987 births
Mexican male professional wrestlers
Living people
Masked wrestlers
Unidentified wrestlers
Professional wrestlers from Mexico City